Pyeonghae O clan was one of the Korean clans. Their Bon-gwan was in Uljin County, North Gyeongsang Province. According to the research in 1985, the number of Pyeonghae O clan was 1264. O Hyeon bo was a 24th descendant of O Cheom who came over from China to Silla during Jijeung of Silla’s reign in Silla dynasty.

See also 
 Korean clan names of foreign origin

References

External links 
 

 
Korean clan names of Chinese origin